Ricot Joseph (born June 16, 1978) is a former American football safety in the National Football League for the Washington Redskins.  He played college football at the University of Central Florida.

References

1978 births
Living people
Haitian players of American football
American football safeties
UCF Knights football players
Washington Redskins players
People from Lake Worth Beach, Florida
Haitian emigrants to the United States